Marko Blazhevski (born 10 November 1992) is a Macedonian swimmer who competes in the Men's 400m individual medley. At the 2012 Summer Olympics he finished 34th overall in the heats in the Men's 400 metre individual medley and failed to reach the final.

Blazhevski graduated from Wingate (N.C.) University, where he was a member of the men's swimming team from 2010 to 2014. He was the NCAA Division II national men's champion in the 400 m individual medley in 2011, 2012 and 2014.

References

Macedonian male swimmers

Living people
Olympic swimmers of North Macedonia
Swimmers at the 2012 Summer Olympics
Swimmers at the 2016 Summer Olympics
Male medley swimmers
Swimmers at the 2010 Summer Youth Olympics
Place of birth missing (living people)
1992 births
Sportspeople from Skopje
Swimmers at the 2013 Mediterranean Games
Mediterranean Games competitors for North Macedonia